Honoring the Fathers of Bluegrass: Tribute to 1946 and 1947 is an album by Ricky Skaggs and Kentucky Thunder, released through Skaggs Family Records on March 25, 2008. In 2009, the album won the group the Grammy Award for Best Bluegrass Album. This album provides as a tribute to the father of bluegrass music, Bill Monroe, along with other bluegrass pioneers, including Lester Flatt, and Earl Scruggs, who made a guest appearance on this album, at 85 years old when the project was recorded.

Track listing

Personnel

 Erick Anderson – Design, Photography
 Paul Brewster – Tenor (Vocal)
 Candy Burton – Make-Up, Hair Stylist
 Mark Fain – Bass
 Lester Flatt – Composer
 Gordon Gillingham – Photography
 Lee Groitzsch – Assistant
 John Hood – Photography
 Cody Kilby – Guitar, Soloist

 Brent King – Engineer, Mixing
 Andy Leftwich – Fiddle
 Del McCoury – Tenor (Vocal), Guest Appearance
 Andrew Mendelson – Mastering
 Jim Mills – Banjo, Bass (Vocal)
 Earl Scruggs – Banjo, Guest Appearance
 Ricky Skaggs – Mandolin, Vocals, Producer, Liner Notes, Photography
 Darrin Vincent – Baritone (Vocal)
 Howard Watts – Composer

Chart performance

References

External links
 Ricky Skaggs' official site

2008 albums
Ricky Skaggs albums
Grammy Award for Best Bluegrass Album
Bill Monroe